The list of shipwrecks in May 1885 includes ships sunk, foundered, grounded, or otherwise lost during May 1885.

1 May

2 May

3 May

4 May

5 May

6 May

7 May

8 May

9 May

10 May

14 May

16 May

17 May

19 May

21 May

22 May

23 May

25 May

26 May

30 May

Unknown date

References

1885-05
Maritime incidents in May 1885